Arago was the name of a number of ships and may refer to: 

 Arago (1854), a schooner in service in the Coast Survey/Coast and Geodetic Survey from 1854 to 1861 and from 1866 to 1881 as USCS/USC&GS Arago
 SS Arago (1855), a steamer chartered by the Union Army during the American Civil War
 Arago (1871), a steamer in service in the Coast Survey/Coast and Geodetic Survey from 1871 to 1890 as USCS/USC&GS Arago
 Arago (1885), a freighter built by the Union Iron Works at San Francisco's Pier 70 for the Oregon Coal Company

United States Coast Survey ship names